CHHO-FM is a French-language community radio format which operates at 103.1 MHz (FM) in Louiseville, Quebec, Canada. Owned by La Coop de Solidarité Radio Communautaire de la MRC de Maskinongé, the station earned approval by the Canadian Radio-television and Telecommunications Commission (CRTC) on July 28, 2005.

The station is a member of the Association des radiodiffuseurs communautaires du Québec.

References

External links

Louiseville
Hho
Hho
Hho
Radio stations established in 2005
2005 establishments in Quebec